Colotis incretus, the yellow orange tip, is a butterfly in the family Pieridae. It is found in southern Kenya, Burundi, Tanzania and Zambia. The habitat consists of moist savanna.

The larvae feed on Capparis, Salvadora persica and Cadaba species.

References

Butterflies described in 1881
incretus
Butterflies of Africa
Taxa named by Arthur Gardiner Butler